Khalid Hussain Magsi (born 2 February 1960) is a Pakistani politician who has been a member of the National Assembly of Pakistan, since August 2018. Previously he was a member of the National Assembly from June 2013 to September 2014 and again from May 2016 to May 2018.

Early life
He was born on 2 February 1960.

Political career

He was elected District nazim of Jhal Magsi in 2005.

He was elected to the National Assembly of Pakistan as an independent candidate from Constituency NA-267 (Kachhi-cum-Jhal Magsi) in 2013 Pakistani general election. He received 42,240 votes and defeated an independent candidate, Abdul Raheem Rind.

In September 2014, Balochistan Election Tribunal declared the election as null and void and ordered re-election in the constituency. He was re-elected to the National Assembly as a candidate of Pakistan Muslim League (N) (PML-N) from Constituency NA-267 (Kachhi-cum-Jhal Magsi) in the by-elections held in April 2016. He received 29,630 votes and defeated Yar Muhammad Rind, a candidate of Pakistan Tehreek-e-Insaf (PTI).

In April 2018, he quit PML-N and joined the newly created Balochistan Awami Party (BAP).

He was re-elected to the National Assembly as a candidate of BAP from Constituency NA-260 (Nasirabad-cum-Kachhi-cum-Jhal Magsi) in 2018 Pakistani general election.

References

Living people
Baloch people
Pakistani MNAs 2013–2018
People from Nasirabad District
1960 births
Pakistan Muslim League (N) MNAs
Pakistani MNAs 2018–2023
Balochistan Awami Party MNAs